George Adam Kissling (3 July 1805 – 9 November 1865) was the second Archdeacon of Waitemata.

A German Lutheran missionary, he married Margaret Moxon on 3 July 1837 at Islington. He was ordained an Anglican priest in 1841 and the following year emigrated to New Zealand. They were sent by the Church Missionary Society to work at the Kawakawa (Hicks Bay) Mission from 1843 to 1846.

George Kissling's ill health resulted in a move to Auckland. George and Margaret Kissling opened a Māori girls boarding school in Kohimarama. He taught students of theology at St John’s College, including Riwai Te Ahu. In 1859 he was appointed Archdeacon of Waitemata.

George Kissling died 9 November 1865.

References

1805 births
1865 deaths
Archdeacons of Waitemata